Elachista menura is a moth of the family Elachistidae that is found in the coastal areas and mountainous areas of New South Wales and Queensland.

The forewings are dark bluish grey and the hindwings are dark grey. Females have a large rounded creamy white patch at the distal part of the wing.

The larvae feed on Gahnia clarkei. They mine the leaves of their host plant. Several larvae may be found on a single leaf. Pupation takes place outside of the mine on a leaf of the host plant. Larvae can be found from July to October.

References

menura
Moths described in 2011
Endemic fauna of Australia
Moths of Australia
Taxa named by Lauri Kaila